Kateryna Tarasenko (born 6 August 1987 in Dnipropetrovsk) is a Ukrainian rower. Along with Yana Dementyeva, she finished 7th in the women's double sculls at the 2008 Summer Olympics. Both of them won a gold medal at the 2012 Summer Olympics in the quadruple sculls event with Nataliya Dovgodko and Anastasiya Kozhenkova.

References 

 
 

1987 births
Living people
Ukrainian female rowers
Sportspeople from Dnipro
Olympic rowers of Ukraine
Rowers at the 2008 Summer Olympics
Rowers at the 2012 Summer Olympics
Olympic gold medalists for Ukraine
Olympic medalists in rowing
Medalists at the 2012 Summer Olympics
World Rowing Championships medalists for Ukraine
European Rowing Championships medalists
21st-century Ukrainian women